The 2003 Idea Prokom Open was a combined men's and women's tennis tournament played on outdoor clay courts in Sopot, Poland, that was part of the International Series of the 2003 ATP Tour and of Tier III of the 2003 WTA Tour. The tournament ran from 28 July through 3 August 2003.

Finals

Men's singles 

 Guillermo Coria defeated  David Ferrer 7–5, 6–1
 It was Coria's 4th title of the year and the 5th of his career.

Women's singles 

 Anna Pistolesi defeated  Klára Koukalová 6–2, 6–0
 It was Pistolesi's 1st title of the year and the 7th of her career.

Men's doubles 

 Mariusz Fyrstenberg /  Marcin Matkowski defeated  František Čermák /  Leoš Friedl 6–4, 6–7(7–9), 6–3
 It was Fyrstenberg's only title of the year and the 1st of his career. It was Matkowski's only title of the year and the 1st of his career.

Women's doubles 

 Tatiana Perebiynis /  Silvija Talaja defeated  Maret Ani /  Libuše Průšová 6–4, 6–2
 It was Perebiynis' only title of the year and the 2nd of her career. It was Talaja's only title of the year and the 3rd of her career.

Idea Prokom Open
Idea Prokom Open
Orange Warsaw Open
Orange